The 2nd Foreign Engineer Regiment is one of two combat engineer regiments of the Foreign Legion in the French Army. The regiment provides the combat engineering component of the 27th Mountain Infantry Brigade. Stationed, since its creation in 1999, on the former site of the French Strategic Nuclear Missiles at Saint Christol, Vaucluse, southern France.

History

The regiment was created in 1999 and is an heir to one of the 18 combat engineer formations of the Foreign Legion in Indochina. The regiment participated to the conservation of the indochinese patrimony of the 5th Foreign Infantry Regiment 5e REI, "The Tonkin Regiment". The regiment is a unit component of the military engineers of the French Army.

The regiment like all Legion regiments is composed of foreign legionnaires. The younger legionnaires are issued from the 4th Foreign Regiment 4e RE while the older legionnaires are selected from other legion regiments.

Since creation, the regiment is stationed in garrison Maréchal Koenig, based on plateau Albion, on the commune of Saint-Christol, Vaucluse, which housed previously the 1st Strategic Missiles Groupment (1er GMS) of the Strategic Air Forces, on Aerial Base 200 Apt-Saint-Christol.

The missions of the regiment at the corps of the 27th Mountain Infantry Brigade (27e BIM) are intelligence gathering, direct combat, mobile support (demining, clearing paths, etc.) to any counter mobilities and the deployment amongst combat units. The particularity of the mountain brigade imposes adaptation to techniques that are demanding and specific in either relieving infantry units or replacing their combat role in operations of area control.

The regiment has been present on most exterior theatres of operations since creation. Projecting each year a number of legionnaires in various fields of operations, the regiment was engaged in Djibouti at the corps of the 13th Demi-Brigade of the Foreign Legion and in Afghanistan, Ivory Coast, French Guiana; similarly, at the corps of the 3rd Foreign Infantry Regiment, in the Balkans, in Martinique and metropole France during interior operations.

Campaigns ( 1999 - present) 

 Engineer Combat Missions

Since creation in 1999, the 2nd Foreign Engineer Regiment has been present in the following theatres of exterior operations:

Djibouti with the 13e DBLE
Afghanistan
Ivory Coast
French Guiana at the corps of the 3e REI
Balkans, Kosovo
Martinique
Lebanon in Opération Baliste launched by French President Jacques Chirac, during the month of July 2006. Following the Israeli bombardments of the bridges in Southern Lebanon, the world needed a combat engineer regiment to intervene quickly and efficiently in the reconstruction of bridges based on the old Bailey bridge system whose concept dates back to World War II. This intervention while very little publicized due to the estival period, allowed to consolidate the operational character in material of intervention of the military capability of combat engineers in the Legion and more particularly at the 2e REG.   
 The regiment intervenese regularly in internal security operations: SATER Plan, "SATER",, (aero-terrestrial specialized French rescue put into motion at the departmental level with objectif of terrestrial search and precise localization of airborne capable civilian or military in distress) supported by elements of the French Air Force. Elements of SATER Plan was used to support protective operations around all the depots before the use of the euro, in 2001.
 The regiment intervenes regularly in internal security operations: Vigipirate, a mission shared and contributed by all other regiments.

 Humanitarian Missions

The regiment also served in metropole France, while barely being created, within operations of the Orsec Disposition, "ORSEC",(ORSEC - Response Organization for Civil Security; the response rescue organization responsible to manage natural disasters and catastrophes beyond level of normal emergencies), at the end of 1999, following the storming thundering path of Cyclone Lothar and Martin which caused the devastation and destruction of a part of Europe.

Organization
The regiment is composed of around 900 to 925 men organized into 6 companies.

Compagnie de Commandement et de Logistique (CCL) - Command and Logistics Company
Legion Pionniers Groups
Compagnie d'Administration et de Soutien (CAS) - Administrative and Services Company
1re Compagnie de Combat - 1st Combat Company (3 combat sections, a support section and a command section)
2e Compagnie de Combat - 2nd Combat Company (3 combat sections, a support section and a command section)
3e Compagnie de Combat - 3rd Combat Company (3 combat sections, a support section and a command section)
Compagnie d'Appui (CA) - Support Company (5 specialist sections)
 PCG Teams (Combat Engineer Divers) former DINOPS Teams of Nautical Subaquatic Intervention Operational Detachment specialized in Parachute, Underwater demolition, Diving and Mountain Commando Group ( GCM ) in some cases as double specialties.

Traditions

Insignias

Regimental Colors

Regimental Song 

Chant de Marche: Rien n'empêche featuring:
De la boue des rizières aux plateaux du Tonkin
Honneur, Fidélité pour unique refrain
Le feu, l'eau et la terre comme seul univers
Il s'avance et combat, le sapeur légionnaire,
Brisant tous les assauts quand la mitraille explose
Sur cette terre d'Indo où tant d'anciens reposent.

Dans le froid, la tourmente, à la mort à la vie
Rien n'empêche le deuxième étranger de génie. (bis)

Aujourd'hui la mémoire sonne le rappel.
Nous, légionnaires du 2 répondons à l'appel.
Ouvrir, tracer la route c'est pour le régiment
Passer coûte que coûte, voilà notre serment
Foi, vaillance et courage comme seul héritage
Nul obstacle et nul homme pour nous faire barrage.

Refrain

Sur les cimes de l'Alpe quand le combat résonne
Du fracas de la foudre et que l'orage tonne
En avant képis blancs, à nous les grands espaces.
En tout lieu en tout temps, il nous faut faire face.
Relever les défis, voilà notre ambition.
Ne jamais faire défaut, c'est notre tradition.

Refrain

Decorations 
croix de la Valeur militaire with one palm since January 3, 2012.
 Another citation for the croix de valeur militaire was attributed on June 20, 2013, the regiment since that date wears the fourragère with colors of the croix de la Valeur Militaire.

Honors

Battle honours
Camerone 1863

Regimental Commanders

 1999 - 2001 :  colonel Nebois
 2001 - 2003 :  colonel Autran
 2003 - 2005 :  colonel Fradin
 2005 - 2007 :  colonel Boucher
 2007 - 2009 :  colonel Chavanat
 2009 - 2011 :  colonel Kirscher
 2011 - 2013 :  colonel Bonini
 2013 - 2015 :  colonel Reussner
 2015 - 2017 :  lieutenant-colonel De Sercey
 2017 - 2021 :  colonel De Boisfleury
 2021 - 20**  :  colonel Emmanuel Combe

See also 
French Army
27th Mountain Infantry Brigade (France)
Major (France)
Music of the Foreign Legion (MLE)
1st Foreign Engineer Regiment
6th Foreign Engineer Regiment
List of French Foreign Legion units

Notes

References
www.legion-etrangere.com

External links
Official website - 2e Régiment étranger de génie 

French Army
Foreign Engineer Regiment, 2nd
Military units and formations established in 1999
1999 establishments in France